Lewisham North was a parliamentary constituency in Lewisham, London which returned one Member of Parliament (MP)  to the House of Commons of the Parliament of the United Kingdom from 1950 until it was abolished for the February 1974 general election.

Boundaries 

The Metropolitan Borough of Lewisham wards of Blackheath and Church Lee, Ladywell, Lewisham Park, Lewisham Village, Manor Lee, and South Lee.

Members of Parliament

Election results

References 

Parliamentary constituencies in London (historic)
Constituencies of the Parliament of the United Kingdom established in 1950
Constituencies of the Parliament of the United Kingdom disestablished in 1974
Politics of the London Borough of Lewisham